The Fundación Teletón in Mexico is an annual 24-plus-hour TV and radio broadcast, started in 1996, to raise money for children's rehabilitation centers (known as Centro de Rehabilitación Infantil Teletón or CRIT – "Teletón Children's Rehabilitation Center" in English). The Mexican Teletón is produced by Televisa and more than 500 Mexican and foreign media; more than 100 commercial firms sponsor the event. Teleton's mission is "to provide knowledge about physical disabilities, giving a strong message about respect, equality and support to people in these conditions". Teletón is the world's largest private medical unit and rehabilitation center for children.

Since 1997, Teletón has begun on the first Friday in December. The 2010 Teletón was held on December 3–4; as always, it was seen as "a project of national unity where Mexicans have the chance to gather and work for the same cause". From 1996 to 2003, the end of the event was marked by a concert in Azteca Stadium. Since 2004, the venue has varied: in 2004 and 2005, it was held at Mexico City's Zócalo, in 2006, at the Foro Sol and in 2007 and 2008, it was moved to the National Auditorium.

Besides creating CRITs all around the country, the CRIT system and the Universidad Autónoma del Estado de México (UAEM) signed an agreement in 2000 creating two bachelors-degree programs training professionals to work with children at the CRITs, and created the Instituto Teletón de Estudios Superiores (ITESUR) (located next to the first CRIT constructed). ITESUR is the only university in Mexico that grants degrees in occupational and physical therapy. In 2012, it was inaugurated in State of Mexico the Centro Autismo Teletón (CAT) which will help children with autism.

From 1997 to 2004, Mexican actress and pop star Lucero was involved in every Teleton as the main spokesperson for most of the broadcast, alongside different news anchor and host of other Televisa programs. In 2003, a scandal involving security guards and the press made her to have her role been downplayed, and other Televisa personalities have been included in the broadcast.

While the main reason of the Teleton is to provide help with the rehabilitation of children that suffer of different brain and mobility discapacities, in 2009 Teletón expanded the objectives to provide help in the treatment of children diagnosed with cancer, hence another event was conceived, Pelonton, consisting of the people donating locks of hair in order to create wigs for those children that suffered loss hair due to cancer treatment. In 2013, it was inaugurated the first oncology children's hospital in Latin America, named Hospital Infantil Teletón de Oncología or HITO in the city of Querétaro.

CRIT locations

The first Teletón was broadcast on December 12, 1997, produced by Televisa and 70 other communications media. By the end of the broadcast, its goal was surpassed. Since then, the goal has been the same amount raised the previous year, plus one Mexican peso.

From 1997 to 2014, Teletón had met its goal every year, producing surpluses which allowed the construction of twenty-one CRITs, one CAT and one HITO. The location of some CRITs is chosen on a geographical basis, so that every region has at least one; the goal is to build one in every state. Others are built in areas which have "earned" them with funds raised:

 State of Mexico - May 13, 1999
 Jalisco - September 29, 2000
 Oaxaca - December 7, 2001
 Aguascalientes - December 6, 2002
 Coahuila - December 5, 2003
 Guanajuato - December 5, 2003
 Hidalgo - November 25, 2005
 Chihuahua - November 23, 2006
 Chiapas - November 28, 2006
 Quintana Roo - November 29, 2007
 Nezahualcóyotl, State of Mexico - November 27, 2007
 Tamaulipas - November 26, 2008
 Yucatán - January 14, 2009
 Veracruz - November 18, 2009
 Durango - November 25, 2009
 Sonora - November 15, 2010
 Baja California Sur - November 23, 2010
 Puebla - November 24, 2011
 Mexico City - November 25, 2011
 Ecatepec, State of Mexico - November 14, 2012 (Centro Autismo Teletón) 
 Guerrero - November 22, 2012
 Michoacán - November 14, 2013
 Querétaro - November 21, 2013 (Hospital Infantil Teletón de Oncología)
 Baja California - December 11, 2015

Controversies

Tax deductions
Since its inception, the Telethon has been accused of allowing the companies that sponsor it to deduct taxes and be free of payments through their donations and not be transparent with the money obtained by the contributions of citizens, because these are made in an anonymous and without granting a tax receipt to support the transaction.

Faced with these accusations, the Telethon Foundation has responded declaring that the tax deduction is a legal figure permitted by the government and that the system used prevents donations from being used for tax evasion. On the other hand, the Servicio de Administración Tributaria stipulates that the maximum amount that a moral person can deduct from taxes through donations is 10% of net profit.

Researcher Sara Murúa considered that this tax method is based on a legal loophole and declared that "the fundamental problem with this type of foundation is the triangulation of its funds, which allows large donors to have privileged tax mechanisms to exempt taxes and, even, for them to declare as their own the donations of third parties, especially individuals." The latter was criticized in reference to donations made anonymously by people, thus benefiting the image of companies.

United Nations reactions 
The Committee on the Rights of Persons with Disabilities of the United Nations (UN) stated in a communication, dated October 3, 2014, its concern about the way in which government resources are administered in the area of rehabilitation of persons with disabilities due to the fact that Mexico grants funds so that the Teletón Foundation - a private organization - is in charge of public health tasks that are the responsibility of the government.

At the same time, this international body criticized the way in which the Telethon Foundation makes people with disabilities see, adding that it "observes that this campaign promotes stereotypes of people with disabilities as subjects of charity [...] Also, it recommends [the committee to the Mexican government] develop programs to raise awareness about people with disabilities as rights holders". Likewise, it asks the Mexican government to investigate and prosecute institutions that apply forced sterilizations to people with disabilities, and guarantee reparations to the victims of this practice. Finally, the international organization delivered a document with 67 recommendations to the federal government of Mexico and Telethon, which to date has not been addressed.

Media participation

In its first broadcast, Teletón (CRIT) counted the participation of 70 national media; the TV and radio stations affiliated with Televisa made it a nationwide campaign. The 2007 broadcast had the participation of more than 500 national and international media; one exception is the other major Mexican TV network, TV Azteca, due to a signal-distribution conflict. 2007 also marked the first time donations were received from foreign countries (from Spain, and from the Hispanic population in the United States and Canada.

Broadcasts

{| class="wikitable"
|-
! Broadcast
! Dates
! Goal
! Total Raised
! Margin (%)
! Approx. USD
! Motto
! Translation
! Mission
|-
| Teletón México 1997
| December 12–13
| MXN$894,000,000
| MXN$338,496,8403
| +73.12%
| $17,015,608MXN 8.1394 = USD 1
| "Juntos haremos el milagro"
| "Together we will make the miracle"
| 
 To build and equip the first two CRITs in Mexico State and Occidente 
 Establish the Teletón Fund for Institutional Support (Fondo Teletón de Apoyo a Instituciones - FTAI) to help other institutions serving the same population
 To donate 8% of the total to victims affected by Hurricane Pauline
|-
| Teletón México 1998
|  December 4–5
| $138,496,841
| $142,937,440
| +3.20%
| $14,365,571MXN 9.95 = USD 1
| "El amor hace milagros"
| "Love makes miracles"
|
 To secure operating funds for the two CRITs
 Continue the FTAI
|-
| Teletón México 1999
| December 3–4
| $142,937,441
| $158,224,117
| +10.70%
| $16,598,212MXN 9.5326 = USD 1
| "El amor hace milagros"
| "Love makes miracles"
|
 To grant "scholarships" for the two CRITs
 Continue the FTAI
|-
| Teletón México 2000
| December 8–9
| $158,224,118
| $201,168,475
| +27.14%
| $21,019,641MXN 9.5705 = USD 1
| "Vamos a dar"
| "Let's give"
|
 To build and equip the third CRIT in Oaxaca 
 To grant "scholarships" for (and ensure future operation of) the two original CRITs 
 Continue the FTAI
|-
| Teletón México 2001
| December 7–8
| $201,168,476
| $207,408,620
| +3.10%
| $22,446,577MXN 9.2401 = USD 1
| "Te estamos esperando"
| "We're waiting for you"
|
 To build and equip the fourth CRIT in Aguascalientes 
 To grant "scholarships" for the three CRITs 
 Continue the FTAI 
 To donate 5% of the total raised to families of Mexican victims who died in the September 11 attacks
|-
| Teletón México 2002
| December 6–7
| $207,408,621
| $217,876,247
| +5.05%
| $21,266,178MXN 10.2452 = USD 1
| "¡Un paso más!"
| "One more step!"
|
 To build the fifth and sixth CRITs, in Coahuila and Guanajuato 
 To grant "scholarships" for the four CRITs 
 Continue the FTAI
|-
| Teletón México 2003
| December 12–13
| $217,876,248
| $247,759,351
| +13.72%
| $22,145,691MXN 11.1877 = USD 1
| "Lo hacemos todos"
| "We all make it"
|
 To equip the fifth and sixth CRITs in Coahuila and Guanajuato 
 To grant "scholarships" for the four CRITs 
 Continue the FTAI
|-
| Teletón México 2004
| December 3–4
| $247,759,352
| $305,650,421
| +23.37%
| $27,424,153MXN 11.1453 = USD 1
| "Unidos por el amor"
| "Together for love"
|
 To build and equip the seventh CRIT in Pachuca, Hidalgo 
 To grant "scholarships" for the six CRITs 
 Continue the FTAI
|-
| Teletón México 2005
| December 2–3
| $305,650,422
| $349,190,470
| +14.25%
| $33,178,187MXN 10.5247 = USD 1
| "Ayudar es amar"
| "Helping is loving"
|
 To build and equip the eighth and ninth CRITs, in Chihuahua and Chiapas
 To grant "scholarships" for the seven CRITs 
 Continue the FTAI
|-
| Teletón México 2006
| December 8–9
| $349,190,471
| $420,369,748
| +20.38%
| $38,723,055MXN 10.8558 = USD 1
| "Necesitamos tu amor"
| "We need your love"
|
 To build and equip the tenth and eleventh CRITs in Nezahualcóyotl, Mexico and Cancun, Quintana Roo 
 Ensure operating funds for the nine CRITs 
 Continue the FTAI
|-
| Teletón México 2007
| December 7–8
| $420,369,749
| $439,968,534
| +4.66%
| $40,599,862MXN 10.8367 = USD 1
| "El Teletón eres tú"
| "You are Teletón"
|
 To build and equip the twelfth and thirteenth CRITs in Tamaulipas and Yucatán 
 Ensure operating funds for the eleven CIRTs
 Continue the FTAI 
 To donate 10% of the total raised to help the affected populations of the 2007 Tabasco flood and Chiapas landslides
|-
| Teletón México 2008
| December 5–6
| $439,968,535
| $440,404,909
| +0.09%
| $32,119,382MXN 13.7115 = USD 1
| "El Teletón lo haces tú"
| "You make Teletón"
|
 To build and equip the fourteenth and fifteenth CRITs in Durango and Poza Rica, Veracruz 
 To create a specialty in rehabilitation medicine and a physical and occupational therapy license at the ITESR (Instituto Teletón de Estudios Superiores en Rehabilitación)
 To upgrade the thirteen CIRTs with new technology
 Ensure operating funds for the thirteen CRITs 
 Continue the FTAI
|-
| Teletón México 2009
| December 4–5
| $440,404,910
| $443,341,815
| +0.66%
| $35,194,517MXN 12.5969 = USD 1
| "No Hay Imposibles"
| "There's no impossibles."
|
 To upgrade the first fifteen CRITs to allow children with cancer 
 To build and equip the sixteenth and seventeenth CRITs in Hermosillo, Sonora and La Paz, Baja California Sur
 Ensure operating funds for the fifteen CRITs 
|-
| Teletón México 2010
| December 3–4
| $445,268,576
| $446,851,910
| +0.03%
| $36,229,865MXN 12.3338 = USD 1
| "Lo mejor de ti, hace grande Mexico"
| "The best of you makes Mexico great"
| 
 To build and equip the eighteenth and nineteenth CRITs in Puebla and the Federal District 
 Ensure operating funds for the seventeen CRITs
|-
|Teletón México 2011
| December 2–3
| $446,851,911
| $450,346,218
| +5.5%
| $32,944,127.139MXN 13.6700 = USD 1
| "Caminemos juntos"
| "Lets walk together"
|
 To build and equip the twentieth CRIT in Acapulco, Guerrero, the first Teleton Oncology Children's Hospital for children with cancer in Queretaro, and the first Teleton Autism Children's Rehabilitation Center for children with autism in Mexico State 
 Ensure operating funds for the nineteen CRITs 
 The last Teletón to broadcast in United States (Teletón USA was created the following year)
|-
|Teletón México 2012
| December 7–8
| $471,472,925
| $472,556,170
| +0.23%
| $36,064,042
| "Gracias a ti"
| "Thanks to you"
|
 To build the twenty-first CRIT in Michoacán and equip the Teleton Oncology Children's Hospital in Querétaro
 Ensure operating funds for the twenty CRITs and the Teleton Autism Children's Rehabilitation Center
|-
|Teletón México 2013
| December 6–7
| $472,556,170
| $473,794,379
| +0.99%
| $36,158,539
| "Gente Extraordinaria"
| "Extraordinary people"
|
 Ensure operating funds for the 21 CRITs, the Teleton Oncology Children's Hospital, and the Teleton Autism Children's Rehabilitation Center
|-
|Teletón México 2014
| December 5–6
| $473,794,380
| $474,143,221
| +0.074%
| $32,116,134
| "Pasión por la vida"
| "Passion for life"
|
 To build and equip the twenty-second CIRT in Baja California
 Ensure operating funds for the 21 CRITs, the Teleton Oncology Children's Hospital, and the Teleton Autism Children's Rehabilitation Center
|-
|Teletón México 2015
| December 12
| $474,143,211  (500,000 visits)
| $327,267,551  (602,710 visits)
| -30.97%
| $19,116,776
| "Ven, conoce y decide" 
| "Come, know and decide"
|
 This will be the first year that Teletón will not raise money
 Although the main reason of this year Teletón is visits, donations were also being accepted 
 At the end of the Teletón $327,267,551 MXN (US$17.8 million) were raised (down 69% from the previous year)
 Ensure operating funds for the 21 CRITs, the Teletón Oncology Children's Hospital, and the Teletón Autism Children's Rehabilitation Center
|-
|Teletón México 2016
|December 10–11
|$327,261,512  (602,711 visits)
|$361,695,829
| +10.51%
|$17,790,798
| "Ven, conoce y únete, tu donación es la solución" 
|"Come, know and join us, your donation is the solution"
|
 The goal is similar to that of 2015, inviting people to come and visit existing CRITs
 At the end of the Teletón $361,695,829 MXN was raised
 Ensure operating funds for 18 of the 21 CRITs, the Teletón Oncology Children's Hospital, and the Teletón Autism Children's Rehabilitation Center
 Ensure extra operating funds for the Durango, Quintana Roo, and Veracruz CRITs to prevent them from closing
|-
|Teletón México 2017–18
|March 23–24
|$361,695,830
|$364,097,181
| +0.65%
|$19,627,880
|"México de pie"
|Mexico standing
|
The telethon was originally scheduled for the weekend of October 6, 2017, but it was postponed because of the earthquakes in Chiapas and Mexico City that occurred during the month of September. 10% of the total was donated to all families that were affected by the earthquakes.
Ensure extra operating funds for the Mexico State, Quintana Roo, and Veracruz CRITs
Last telethon to air over a two-day period
|-
|Teletón Mexico 2018
|December 8
|$364,097,182
|$367,190,205
| +0.84%
|$18,132,849
|rowspan="2"|"¿A ti que te gusta hacer?"
|rowspan="2"|What do you like to do?
|rowspan="2"|
Ensure operating funds for all 21 CRITs and both ancillary facilities
|-
|Teletón Mexico 2019
|December 14
|$367,190,206
|$374,250,109
| +1.92%
|$19,000,000
|-
|Teletón Mexico 2020
|December 5
|
|
|
|
|"Capacidad sin límites" ''"Nos mueves tú"|"Unlimited capacity" "You move us"
|*Special telethon to raise money for research of COVID-19.
|}

Sponsors

The Teletón production is supported by enterprises who also finance year-round expenses of the CRITs. There is only one sponsor for each product category.

The first broadcast had nine sponsors; by 2008 the number was 26. Some businesses which have participated are:

TeletónUSA
In 2012, Teletón, in cooperation with the Univision television network, created TeletónUSA''', an American charity with the same aim to help sick, disabled, and mentally-challenged children in America's Hispanic communities. Its first telethon was broadcast December 14 and 15, 2012 on the Univision network, and was hosted by famed Univision personality Don Francisco, who has hosted a similar telethon in Chile. The first edition of TeletónUSA took US$8,150,625 in pledges, exceeding its initial goal of US$7 million.

In November 2014 The CRIT opened its first location in the United States in San Antonio, Texas.

Notes

External links

ORITEL - Organización Internacional de Teletones (Pan-Latin-American organisation which Teletón Mexico is a part of)
Teletón USA

Telethons
Las Estrellas original programming
Recurring events established in 1997
1997 Mexican television series debuts
Non-profit organizations based in Mexico
Mexican television specials